Holy Spirit Church, Newtown is a parish church in the Church of England located in Newtown, Isle of Wight.

History

The church dates from 1835 by the architect A. F. Livesay, and was built on the site of a ruined medieval chapel. Architectural historian Nikolaus Pevsner described the church as 'the finest early nineteenth century church on the Island'.

Church status

The church is grouped with All Saints' Church, Calbourne.

References

External links
The Gentleman's Magazine August 1838 on the church

Church of England church buildings on the Isle of Wight
Grade II listed churches on the Isle of Wight
Holy Spirit